Cosmopterix metis is a moth of the family Cosmopterigidae. It is known from the Federal District of Brazil.

Adults have been recorded in July.

Description

Male. Forewing length 3.7 mm. Head: frons shining grey, in middle a shining white streak, vertex and neck tufts shining bronze brown with some reddish reflection, laterally lined white, collar shining bronze brown; labial palpus first segment very short, white, second segment three-quarters of the length of third, dark brown with white longitudinal lines laterally and ventrally, third segment white, lined brown laterally, extreme apex white; scape dorsally dark brown with a white anterior line, ventrally white, antenna shining dark brown with a white interrupted line from base to two-fifths with a short uninterrupted section at base, two indistinct subapical greyish rings of two segments each, separated by two dark brown segments at three-quarters, apical part of eighteen segments greyish brown. Thorax and tegulae shining bronze brown with reddish gloss. Legs: shining dark brown, femur of hindleg shining golden, foreleg with a white line on tibia and tarsal segments one and two, segment four with a white apical ring, segment five entirely white, tibia of midleg with silvery white oblique basal and medial lines and a white apical ring, tarsal segments one, two and four with white apical rings, segment five dorsally white, tibia of hindleg with a silvery metallic basal streak, silvery metallic medial and subapical rings, and a white apical ring, tarsal segments one to three with white apical rings and segment four and five entirely white, spurs dark brown, apically lighter. Forewing with basal one-sixth shining bronze brown with reddish gloss, remaining part shining dark brown with reddish gloss, at one-fifth three short silver metallic streaks with bluish reflection, a subcostal, a medial just above fold and slightly further from base than the subcostal and a subdorsal, slightly further from base than the medial, a tubercular silver metallic fascia with greenish and purplish reflections in the middle, perpendicular on dorsum and with a large square bronze brown spot on dorsum on the outside, at two-thirds a tubercular silver metallic dorsal spot with bluish reflection, at three-quarters a tubercular pale golden costal spot, smaller than the dorsal spot, edged by a narrow white costal streak, apical line as a short silver metallic streak with bluish reflection in the middle of the apical area and a broad white spot in the cilia at apex, cilia dark brown, paler on dorsum towards base. Hindwing shining dark greyish brown, cilia dark brown. Underside: forewing shining dark greyish brown with the white costal streak and apical spot distinctly visible, hindwing greyish brown. Abdomen dorsally shining pale ochreous-brown with reddish gloss, laterally with golden and greenish reflections, ventrally shining dark brown, segments broadly banded shining white posteriorly, anal tuft greyish brown.

Etymology
The species is named after Metis, a moon of Jupiter. To be treated as a noun in apposition.

References

metis